People Express Airlines (stylized as PEOPLExpress) was an airline that began operations on June 30, 2014 from Newport News/Williamsburg International Airport, targeting the no-frills budget flyer. The air carrier took its name from the original PEOPLExpress Airlines which operated in the 1980s but was unrelated.  Due to complications with its contracted fleet, including one aircraft having been hit by a ground vehicle, the airline abruptly ceased operations on September 26, 2014, leaving some passengers stranded and others holding tickets that were not transferable to other carriers. Its hub airport located in Newport News commenced eviction of the airline from the airport terminal on November 12, 2014. On January 22, 2015, People Express Airlines was evicted from its offices at the Newport News/Williamsburg International Airport.

History

Beginnings 
The airline was publicly launched during a press conference at the Newport News airport on February 13, 2012, though its organization began in April 2011 when Michael Morisi, an official at the original People Express Airlines and chief operating officer for the revived company, began bringing together a group of people to start the company. People Express received financing from private investors and Newport News area businesses.

Service was initially anticipated to begin late-2013, but several delays caused the launch date to push back to mid-2014. People Express had initially intended to acquire Xtra Airways in order to expedite the airline's certification process, but the deal was never finalized due to issues identified during the due diligence process. On October 5, Jeffrey Erickson, former Atlas Air President and CEO was announced as PEOPLExpress' first CEO.

Start of operations 

At a press event on May 30, 2014, PEX announced that flight operations would commence on June 30, 2014. Flights were operated by Vision Airlines doing business as PEOPLExpress. The airline utilized Vision Airlines' existing USDOT scheduled authority and FAA Part 121 certification. People Express had planned on obtaining its own FAA certification and begin operating independently within the next few years.

The airline's business model was to operate to niche markets, largely in the eastern United States, that were underserved or unserved by mainline airlines while charging about 40% less than typical fares. The airline's base and hub were located at Newport News/Williamsburg International Airport (PHF) in Newport News, VA.  The airport was previously served by AirTran in 2012 and Allegiant Air in 2014; however, both airlines then ceased serving Newport News.  In addition, the airport had previously received jet service over the years operated by Allegheny Airlines, National Airlines, Piedmont Airlines (1948-1989) and United Airlines as well as USAir and its successor US Airways.

End of operations 
On September 26, 2014, the airline announced what it expected to be a temporary suspension of all service until October 16, 2014. According to CEO Jeff Erickson, the airline was forced to suspend operations when both of its aircraft were incapacitated. A vendor's truck crashed into one plane on September 17, and the second was forced out of service on September 26 due to an unspecified maintenance issue.

The airline subsequently announced that it would not resume operations on October 16, 2014, and on November 12, 2014, PEOPLExpress was evicted from the Newport News/Williamsburg International Airport due to non-payment of Passenger Facilities Charges of US$100,000. On January 22, 2015, People Express Airlines was evicted from its office space at the Newport News/Williamsburg International Airport due to non-payment of utility bills.

In July 2019, Michael Morisi pleaded guilty to fraud charges in relation to the collapse of the airline. On February 21, 2020 he was jailed for two years.

Destinations 
People Express served or planned to serve the following destinations in the United States:

Historical fleet 
People Express operated as a virtual airline exclusively flying Boeing 737-400 aircraft operated by Vision Airlines including Vision Airlines flight crew.  The aircraft were configured with 150 (12/138) seats.

Frequent flyer program 
People Express' frequent flier program was called SMARTbank, and it also operated Club Travelati, a group for customers to receive special discounts. In May 2012, the airline was fined by the United States Department of Transportation for violating a ban on premature advertising in connection with its solicitation for memberships in Club Travelati, of which the airline claimed to have sold over 130 before suspending sales at the end of March 2012.

See also 
 List of defunct airlines of the United States

References

External links 

 

2012 establishments in Virginia
Companies based in Newport News, Virginia
Defunct airlines of the United States
Airlines established in 2012
Airlines disestablished in 2014
2014 disestablishments in Virginia